Picota District is one of ten districts of the province Picota in Peru.

References